Bolshepanyushevo is a rural locality (a selo) and the administrative center of Bolshepanyushevsky Selsoviet, Aleysky District, Altai Krai, Russia. The population was 507 as of 2013. There are 9 streets.

Geography 
Bolshepanyushevo is located on the Aley river, 8 km northeast of Aleysk (the district's administrative centre) by road. Uspenovka is the nearest rural locality.

References 

Rural localities in Aleysky District